Twynham was the original name of Christchurch, Dorset, in England, which was called Twynham until the end of the eleventh century.

It can also refer to:

Frederick Twynham (1806–1868), English cricketer
Gary Twynham (b. 1976), English footballer
Twynham School in Christchurch